Zoe Vrakatitsis (July 18, 1919 - June 3, 2010) was a manager, bookkeeper, and state legislator in the U.S. state of New Hampshire. She lived in Keene. She graduated from Dresser Business School in Keene and attended Utica College, part of Syracuse University. She was a member of the Greek Orthodox Church.

She served on Keene's city council. Margaret A. Lynch defeated her in the 1978 general election.

References

1919 births
2010 deaths
Republican Party members of the New Hampshire House of Representatives
Women state legislators in New Hampshire
People from Keene, New Hampshire
Utica University alumni